Astroparticle physics, also called particle astrophysics, is a branch of particle physics that studies elementary particles of astronomical origin and their relation to astrophysics and cosmology. It is a relatively new field of research emerging at the intersection of particle physics, astronomy, astrophysics, detector physics, relativity, solid state physics, and cosmology. Partly motivated by the discovery of neutrino oscillation, the field has undergone rapid development, both theoretically and experimentally, since the early 2000s.

History
The field of astroparticle physics is evolved out of optical astronomy. With the growth of detector technology came the more mature astrophysics, which involved multiple physics subtopics, such as mechanics, electrodynamics, thermodynamics, plasma physics, nuclear physics, relativity, and particle physics. Particle physicists found astrophysics necessary due to difficulty in producing particles with comparable energy to those found in space. For example, the cosmic ray spectrum contains particles with energies as high as 1020 eV, where a proton-proton collision at the Large Hadron Collider occurs at an energy of ~1012 eV.

The field can be said to have begun in 1910, when a German physicist named Theodor Wulf measured the ionization in the air, an indicator of gamma radiation, at the bottom and top of the Eiffel Tower. He found that there was far more ionization at the top than what was expected if only terrestrial sources were attributed for this radiation.

The Austrian physicist Victor Francis Hess hypothesized that some of the ionization was caused by radiation from the sky. In order to defend this hypothesis, Hess designed instruments capable of operating at high altitudes and performed observations on ionization up to an altitude of 5.3 km. From 1911 to 1913, Hess made ten flights to meticulously measure ionization levels. Through prior calculations, he did not expect there to be any ionization above an altitude of 500 m if terrestrial sources were the sole cause of radiation. His measurements however, revealed that although the ionization levels initially decreased with altitude, they began to sharply rise at some point. At the peaks of his flights, he found that the ionization levels were much greater than at the surface. Hess was then able to conclude that "a radiation of very high penetrating power enters our atmosphere from above." Furthermore, one of Hess's flights was during a near-total eclipse of the Sun. Since he did not observe a dip in ionization levels, Hess reasoned that the source had to be further away in space. For this discovery, Hess was one of the people awarded the Nobel Prize in Physics in 1936. In 1925, Robert Millikan confirmed Hess's findings and subsequently coined the term 'cosmic rays'.

Many physicists knowledgeable about the origins of the field of astroparticle physics prefer to attribute this 'discovery' of cosmic rays by Hess as the starting point for the field.

Topics of research
While it may be difficult to decide on a standard 'textbook' description of the field of astroparticle physics, the field can be characterized by the topics of research that are actively being pursued. The journal Astroparticle Physics accepts papers that are focused on new developments in the following areas:

 High-energy cosmic-ray physics and astrophysics;
 Particle cosmology;
 Particle astrophysics;
 Related astrophysics: supernova, active galactic nuclei, cosmic abundances, dark matter etc.;
 High-energy, VHE and UHE gamma-ray astronomy;
 High- and low-energy neutrino astronomy;
 Instrumentation and detector developments related to the above-mentioned fields.

Open questions
One main task for the future of the field is simply to thoroughly define itself beyond working definitions and clearly differentiate itself from astrophysics and other related topics.

Current unsolved problems for the field of astroparticle physics include characterization of dark matter and dark energy. Observations of the orbital velocities of stars in the Milky Way and other galaxies starting with Walter Baade and Fritz Zwicky in the 1930s, along with observed velocities of galaxies in galactic clusters, found motion far exceeding the energy density of the visible matter needed to account for their dynamics. Since the early nineties some candidates have been found to partially explain some of the missing dark matter, but they are nowhere near sufficient to offer a full explanation. The finding of an accelerating universe suggests that a large part of the missing dark matter is stored as dark energy in a dynamical vacuum.

Another question for astroparticle physicists is why is there so much more matter than antimatter in the universe today. Baryogenesis is the term for the hypothetical processes that produced the unequal numbers of baryons and antibaryons in the early universe, which is why the universe is made of matter today, and not antimatter.

Experimental facilities
The rapid development of this field has led to the design of new types of infrastructure. In underground laboratories or with specially designed telescopes, antennas and satellite experiments, astroparticle physicists employ new detection methods to observe a wide range of cosmic particles including neutrinos, gamma rays and cosmic rays at the highest energies. They are also searching for dark matter and gravitational waves. Experimental particle physicists are limited by the technology of their terrestrial accelerators, which are only able to produce a small fraction of the energies found in nature.

Facilities, experiments and laboratories involved in astroparticle physics include:
 IceCube (Antarctica). The longest particle detector in the world, was completed in December 2010. The purpose of the detector is to investigate high energy neutrinos, search for dark matter, observe supernovae explosions, and search for exotic particles such as magnetic monopoles.
 ANTARES (telescope). (Toulon, France). A Neutrino detector 2.5 km under the Mediterranean Sea off the coast of Toulon, France. Designed to locate and observe neutrino flux in the direction of the southern hemisphere.
 XENONnT, the upgrade of XENON1T, is a dark matter direct search experiment located at the Gran Sasso National Laboratories and will be sensitive to WIMPs with SI cross section of 10−48 cm2. 
 BOREXINO, a real-time detector, installed at Laboratori Nazionali del Gran Sasso, designed to detect neutrinos from the Sun with an organic liquid scintillator target.
 Pierre Auger Observatory (Malargüe, Argentina). Detects and investigates high energy cosmic rays using two techniques. One is to study the particles interactions with water placed in surface detector tanks. The other technique is to track the development of air showers through observation of ultraviolet light emitted high in the Earth's atmosphere.
 CERN Axion Solar Telescope (CERN, Switzerland). Searches for axions originating from the Sun. 
 NESTOR Project (Pylos, Greece). The target of the international collaboration is the deployment of a neutrino telescope on the sea floor off of Pylos, Greece.
 Kamioka Observatory is a neutrino and gravitational waves laboratory located underground in the Mozumi Mine near the Kamioka section of the city of Hida in Gifu Prefecture, Japan.
 Laboratori Nazionali del Gran Sasso is a laboratory that hosts experiments that require a low noise background environment. Located within the Gran Sasso mountain, near L'Aquila (Italy). Its experimental halls are covered by 1400m of rock, which protects experiments from cosmic rays. 
 SNOLAB
 Aspera European Astroparticle network Started in July 2006 and is responsible for coordinating and funding national research efforts in Astroparticle Physics.
 Telescope Array Project (Delta, Utah) An experiment for the detection of ultra high energy cosmic rays (UHECRs) using a ground array and fluorescence techniques in the desert of west Utah.

See also 
 Astroparticle Physics (journal)
 Urca process
 Unsolved problems in physics

References

External links

Aspera European network portal
www.astroparticle.org: all about astroparticle physics...
Aspera news
Astroparticle physics news on Twitter
Virtual Institute of Astroparticle Physics
Helmholtz Alliance for Astroparticle Physics
UCLA Astro-Particle Physics at UCLA
Journal of Cosmology and Astroparticle Physics
 Astroparticle Physics in the Netherlands
 Astroparticle and High Energy Physics
ASD: Astroparticle Physics Laboratory at NASA
Teaching Astroparticle Physics

 
Particle physics